Cophixalus nubicola is a species of frog in the family Microhylidae. It is endemic to Papua New Guinea and only known from its type locality, Mount Michael in the Eastern Highlands Province. The specific name nubicola refers to its cloud-swept habitat. Common name Michael rainforest frog has been coined for  this species.

Description
The snout is bluntly rounded. The tympanum is visible but not prominent, and it is partially hidden by a weak supratympanic fold. The fingers and toes bear discs that are better developed on the former. No webbing is present. The body is dorsally slightly rugose and ventrally granular. The dorsal color is reddish brown. A fine vertebral line and light spots may be present. Ventral surfaces are lightly mottled.

Cophixalus nubicola is similar to Cophixalus parkeri but has shorter legs and less well-developed finger discs.

Habitat and conservation

Cophixalus nubicola has not been collected after its description, but there have been no surveys either. The forests at higher elevations of Mount Michael experience pressure from the high human population density in the adjacent lowlands, constituting a threat. Furthermore, the species is only known from a single location, which is not protected.

References

nubicola
Endemic fauna of New Guinea
Endemic fauna of Papua New Guinea
Amphibians of Papua New Guinea
Amphibians described in 1962
Taxa named by Richard G. Zweifel
Taxonomy articles created by Polbot